Minotaur Kneeling over Sleeping Girl is a 1933 etching by Pablo Picasso.  It is part of the Vollard Suite of 100 etchings (No. 93, Bloch 201, Baer 369).  It is the first example among several works to be realized through the remaining part of the decade where Picasso used the theme of the legendary Minoan creature, the Minotaur.

Sources

Books

 

1933 works
Pablo Picasso etchings
Depictions of kneeling
Minotaur
Classical mythology in art